The 2010 elections for the Pennsylvania State Senate were held on November 2, 2010, with the even-numbered districts contested. Necessary primary elections were held on May 18, 2010. The term of office for those elected in 2010 run from January 4, 2011 until November 30, 2014. State Senators are elected for four year terms, with half of the seats in the Senate up for election every two years.

Make-up of the Senate following the 2010 elections

General election

References

External links
 2010 General Election, Senator in the General Assembly (Pennsylvania Department of State)

2010 Pennsylvania elections
2010
Pennsylvania Senate